Sakhiabad may refer to:
 Sakhiabad, Golestan
 Sakhiabad, Isfahan
 Sakhiabad, Sistan and Baluchestan